This is a list of football games played by the South Korea national football team between 1970 and 1979.

Results by year

List of matches

1970

Source:

1971

Source:

1972

Source:

1973

Source:

1974

Source:

1975

Source:

1976

Source:

1977

Source:

1978

Source:

1979

Source:

See also
 South Korea national football team results
 South Korea national football team

References

External links

1970s in South Korean sport
1970